Ostrówek  is a village in the administrative district of Gmina Trzeszczany, within Hrubieszów County, Lublin Voivodeship, in eastern Poland. It is about 20km west of Hrubieszow.

The village has a population of 270.

References

Villages in Hrubieszów County